A92 or A-92 may refer to:

 A92 road, Scotland
 Autovía A-92, a Spanish motorway
 Dutch Defence, in the Encyclopaedia of Chess Openings
 A92 (group), an Irish hip hop collective